Sally's Cove is a town in the Canadian province of Newfoundland and Labrador. It is located on the west coast of the island of Newfoundland, and is surrounded by Gros Morne National Park. The town had a population of 15 in the Canada 2021 Census.

Demographics 

See also
 List of cities and towns in Newfoundland and Labrador

References 

Towns in Newfoundland and Labrador